Bertie Henry West Elkin (14 January 1886 – 3 June 1962) was a professional footballer and golfer. He played football for Fulham, Luton Town, Stockport County and Tottenham Hotspur. Later he emigrated to South Africa and became a professional golfer.

Football career 
Elkin had spells at Fulham and Luton before joining Stockport County where he played 47 matches between 1908–09. The right back signed for Tottenham Hotspur in 1909 and went on to feature in 27 matches in all competitions for the Lilywhites.

Golf career 
Elkin emigrated to South Africa in September 1911 and became a professional golfer. He won the 1923 South African PGA Championship, the 1924 South African Open and the 1926 Transvaal Open. He was twice the losing finalist in the South African PGA Championship, in 1934 and 1940, the latter at the age of 54.

References

1886 births
1962 deaths
People from Neasden
Footballers from the London Borough of Brent
English footballers
Association football fullbacks
Fulham F.C. players
Luton Town F.C. players
Stockport County F.C. players
Tottenham Hotspur F.C. players
English Football League players
South African male golfers
British emigrants to South Africa